The Sea Marge Hotel is an AA 4-star hotel in the English seaside village of Overstrand in the county of Norfolk. The hotel also has 2 AA Rosettes for Food.

Location 

History 
The Sea Marge was designed by Architect Sir Arthur William Blomfield and was built between 1908 and 1912 as a country home for Sir Edgar Speyer. Speyer was an American-born financier and philanthropist of German parentage. Speyer was chairman of Speyer Brothers, an international finance house and chairman of the Underground Electric Railways Company of London (UERL, forerunner of the London Underground) from 1906 to 1915. Speyer rescued the Promenade Concerts from disaster and directed the funding of Captain Scott's Antarctic expeditions.

Spying accusations 
Following the outbreak of the First World War and widespread suspicion of people of German descent, accusations of Speyer's disloyalty and treachery appeared in the press. Speyer was accused of signalling to German submarines from the cliff-top gardens of the Sea Marge. Lady Speyer was ostracised from societies and associations in both London and Norfolk, of which she had formerly been a member. Speyer and his family abandoned the house and moved to New York, soon after 1916, never to return to the Sea Marge.

Sale 
On 16 February 1932, Speyer died from complications following an operation on his nose in Berlin. The Sea Marge and five acres of terraced gardens were sold as part of his estate in 1935. Following the sale, the house was turned into a hotel by a Mr Hartsharn and Mr G Varley in 1936. In 1955, the Sea Marge was sold to the local authority and was opened as a care home.

The hotel today 
In 1996, the Sea Marge was bought and restored by Marc and Liz Mackenzie. They re-opened it as the historic Grade II listed hotel it remains to this day, with the interior restored with the Edwardian fixtures and features retained respectfully. The hotel retains the gardens and terraced lawns that run down to the coastal path and beach beyond.

References

Bibliography

Hotels in North Norfolk
Hotels in Norfolk
Hotels established in 1936
Hotels established in 1996
Grade II listed hotels
Arthur Blomfield buildings